Poecilonota is a genus of beetles in the family Buprestidae, containing the following species:

 Poecilonota bridwelli Van Dyke, 1918
 Poecilonota californica Chamberlin, 1922
 Poecilonota cyanipes (Say, 1823)
 Poecilonota ferrea (Melsheimer, 1845)
 Poecilonota fraseri Chamberlin, 1922
 Poecilonota montana Chamberlin, 1922
 Poecilonota plebeja (Fabricius, 1777)
 Poecilonota salixi Chamberlin, 1925
 Poecilonota semenovi Obenberger, 1934
 Poecilonota thureura (Say, 1832)
 Poecilonota variolosa (Paykull, 1799)
 Poecilonota viridicyanea Nelson, 1997

References

Buprestidae genera
Taxa named by Johann Friedrich von Eschscholtz